The bibliography of Carl Linnaeus includes academic works about botany, zoology, nomenclature and taxonomy written by the Swedish botanist Carl Linnaeus (1707–1778). Linnaeus laid the foundations for the modern scheme of binomial nomenclature and is known as the father of modern taxonomy. His most famous works is Systema Naturae which is considered as the starting point for zoological nomenclature together with Species Plantarum which is internationally accepted as the beginning of modern botanical nomenclature.

Published works

(1735) Systema Naturae
(1736) Fundamenta Botanica
(1736) Bibliotheca Botanica
(1736) 
(1737) Critica Botanica
(1737) Flora Lapponica
(1737) Genera Plantarum
(1737) Hortus Cliffortianus
(1738) Classes plantarum
(1740) Orbis eruditi judicium de Caroli Linnaei MD scriptis
(1745) Öländska och Gothländska Resa
(1745) Flora Svecica
(1746) Fauna Svecica
(1747) Flora Zeylanica
(1747) Wästgötha Resa
(1748) Hortus Uppsaliensis
(1749) Materia Medica
(1751) Philosophia Botanica
(1751) Skånska Resa
(1752) Odores Medicamentorum
(1753) Species Plantarum
(1753) Museum Tessinanum
(1754, 1759) Flora Anglica
(1754) Museum S:ae R:ae M:tis Adolphi Friderici
(1762) Inebriantia
(1763) Centuria Insectorum
(1764) Museum S:ae M:tis Ludovicae Ulricae Reginae
(1766) Clavis Medicinae Duplex
(1767) Mantissa Plantarum
(1771) Mantissa Plantarum Altera
(1773) Deliciae Naturae
(1774) Systema Vegetabilium

Posthumous publications

Paul Dietrich Giseke was a student and friend of Linnaeus, who kept notes on Linnaeus' lectures and published then after Linnaeus' death as Praelectiones in ordines naturales plantarum (1792).

(1792) Praelectiones in ordines naturales plantarum published by  Benj. Gottl. Hoffmanni.
(1907) Föreläsningar öfver stenriket published by C. Benedicks
(1907) Lachesis naturalis published by A.O. Lindfors
(1957) Örtabok published by T. Fredbärj
(1957) Diaeta naturalis 1733 published by A. Hj. Uggla

Edited works 

Amoenitates Academicae 10 vols. 1787–1790

References

Notes

Bibliography

Works by Linnaeus 

 
  (also in Google Books)

External links

Bibliography
Linnaeus, Carl
Linnaeus, Carl
Linnaeus, Carl